Josias Cornelis Rappard (24 April 1824, Nijmegen - 17 May 1898, Leiden) was a Dutch soldier and artist. Some of his paintings were made into lithographs and illustrations. He spent time in Indonesia and made artworks there.

Rappard's father was Anthony (Antonij) Rappard (1785–1851) and his mother Cornelia Arnolda Josina de Villeneuve (1792–1860). In 1851 he married in Batavia Cornelia Nicolina Tromp (1831–1893), they had eight children. Rappard was a colonel in the infantry of the Royal Netherlands East Indies Army. He produced many paintings and drawings of life in Dutch East Indies.

After his return to the Netherlands, he continued to work on his paintings of the Indies. The Royal Tropical Institute in Amsterdam holds many lithographs made in the years 1882–1889 form Rappard's watercolors of Rappard.

Gallery

References

Josias Rappard Geheugenvannederland

1824 births
1898 deaths
Dutch colonels
Dutch male painters
Dutch painters
People from Nijmegen
People of the Dutch East Indies
Royal Netherlands East Indies Army personnel